Ahmed Bahja (born 21 December 1970, in Marrakech) is a retired Moroccan footballer. He played for several clubs, including KAC Marrakech and Raja CA. He has also played for the famous UAE club, AlWasl of Dubai. In addition, he played for Al-Nasr, Al-Ittihad, Al-Hilal in Saudi Arabia and Al-Gharafa in Qatar 2 loane spells 1996 & 1998 for Qatar Emir Cup.

Bahja played for the Morocco national football team and was a participant at the 1992 Summer Olympics and the 1994 FIFA World Cup.

Club career

Emirates League..
2 spells less than 1 Seasons ..

Goals .. 0 + 4

Emirates Cup..
2 spells less than 1 Seasons ..

Goals .. 4 + 5

Arabian Clubs Championship 3 éditions 3 clubs..
1994 + 1999 + 2003..

Games..4 + 4 + 2F

Goals..4 + 3 + 1

FIFA Clubs World Cup 2000..

Games..3

Goals..1

Assists..1

Total Career Stats With Emirates clubs in all comps:

Goals..13

Total Career Stats With Gulf clubs in all comps:

Goals..124

1993 Caf Champions League..

Goals  .. 2

Bahdja deal with al ittihad fc: 0.2 m$ for kawkab merakchi 50k$ for bahdja.

Bahdja deal with al wasl fc: 1.05 m$0.8m$ for ittihad & 0.25m$ for bahdja 14k$ monthly 3 years deal

Bahdja deal with al nasser fc: 0.9 m$ for alwasl fc &  12k$ monthly 3 years deal until 16 May 2000 19.5k SR clause libération.

Club career stats

National team career

Honours

Club
Al Gharafa
Qatar Emir Cup: 1996
Qatar Emir Cup: 1998
Ittihad Fc
Saudi Premier League: 1996/1997
Saudi Premier League: 1998/1999
Saudi Federation Cup: 1996/1997
Saudi Federation Cup: 1998/1999
Saudi Crown Prince Cup: 1996/1997
 Asian Cup Winners Cup : 1999
Hillal FC
Saudi Crown Prince Cup: 1994/1995
Arab Club Champions Cup:1994

Individual
SFA Forward of the Season: 1997
Arabian Golden Shoe: 1997 
Saudi Premier League Top Scorer: 1996–97:25 goals 
Saudi Federation Cup Top Scorer: 1996–97 :12 goals
 Asian Cup Winners Cup Top Scorer : 1999 : 6 goals
 Qatar Emir Cup Top Scorer : 1998 : 10 goals
 Arab Cup Winners' Cup Top Scorer : 1996 : 4 goals
 Botola Pro 1 Top Scorer : 93/1994 : 14 goals

Notes

References

1970 births
Moroccan footballers
Moroccan expatriate footballers
Morocco international footballers
Living people
Association football forwards
1994 FIFA World Cup players
1998 African Cup of Nations players
2000 African Cup of Nations players
Ittihad FC players
Footballers at the 1992 Summer Olympics
Olympic footballers of Morocco
Raja CA players
Al-Wasl F.C. players
Al Hilal SFC players
Sportspeople from Marrakesh
Al Nassr FC players
Kawkab Marrakech players
UAE Pro League players
Botola players
Saudi Professional League players
Moroccan expatriate sportspeople in Qatar
Moroccan expatriate sportspeople in Saudi Arabia
Moroccan expatriate sportspeople in Sudan
Moroccan expatriate sportspeople in the United Arab Emirates
Expatriate footballers in Qatar
Expatriate footballers in Saudi Arabia
Expatriate footballers in Sudan
Expatriate footballers in the United Arab Emirates